Bhadrachalam is 2001 Telugu action sports film directed by N. Shankar, starring Srihari and Sindhu Menon in the lead roles.

Cast

 Srihari as Bhadrachalam 
 Sindhu Menon as Mahalaxmi 
 Vijay Chander as Parashuram 
 Roopa
 Kota Srinivasa Rao
 Mallikarjuna Rao
 Brahmanandam
 M.S. Narayana
 Babu Mohan
 AVS
 Prasad Babu
 Narra Venkateswara Rao
 Raja Ravindra
 Gundu Hanumantha Rao
 Gautam Raju
 Shanoor Sana
 Nisha

Soundtrack
All songs were composed by Vandemataram Srinivas.

Awards
The film won Nandi Award for Best Fight Master - Vijayan

References

External links
 Bhadrachalam film on youtube

Indian action films
Kung fu films
Taekwondo films
2000s Telugu-language films
Films directed by N. Shankar
2001 martial arts films
2001 films

Indian martial arts films
2001 action films